G. Edward Williams (1885 - August 17, 1940) was an American lawyer and Democratic politician.

Biography 
G. Edward Williams was born in 1885. He received a B. S. degree from Mississippi College in 1905. In 1915, Williams was elected to represent the 12th District in the Mississippi State Senate, as the Hinds and Warren Counties floater representative. He was a resident of Jackson, Mississippi, at the time. After his district was redistricted in the middle of the term, George Anderson of Vicksburg was elected, but Williams contested his seat due to being "legislated out of office". Williams moved to Clarksdale, Mississippi, in 1920, where he served as a chancery judge for several years. On August 17, 1940, Williams was driving his car, when it was struck by another car; he died of a cerebral hemorrhage at the Dr. I. W. Barrett Clinic in Clarksdale 30 minutes later.

References 

1885 births
1940 deaths
Mississippi lawyers
Democratic Party Mississippi state senators
People from Clarksdale, Mississippi
Date of birth missing
Place of birth missing
Mississippi College alumni